The Western Suburbs is the western precinct of the city of Mumbai, India. The Western Suburbs consist of Andheri, Bandra, Bhayander, Borivali, Dahisar, Goregaon, Jogeshwari, Juhu, Kandivali, Khar, Malad, Mira Road, Santacruz and Vile Parle. Geographically, the Western Suburbs lie at the western part of Salsette Island, is a continuous urban sprawl spanning the areas from Bandra to Bhayander, which is separated by the Vasai Creek from Vasai-Virar city and Mithi River from Mumbai city district (Churchgate to Mahim).

The Western Suburbs are some of the oldest suburbs of the city. In particular, Bandra has existed as a separate town almost as long as Mumbai. The area started its history as a bunch of fishing villages. River Mithi flows through this area and also serves as a sewage line. In the 1980s, a well-intentioned attempt to set up a new downtown away from Nariman Point resulted in the establishment of the Bandra Kurla Complex. Most of the larger financial banks and companies moved to this place.

Apart from the usual suburban sprawl, this area has some nice beaches, especially near Malad. Jogeshwari has hot springs which are reputed to have medicinal properties. Borivali is the entry point for the Sanjay Gandhi National Park, which is why the wildlife reserve is more popularly known as Borivali National Park.

Many software and BPO companies have their offices in and around SEEPZ in Andheri. The western suburbs also boast of the Juhu Beach. These suburbs can get extremely crowded in the evenings, with very severe traffic jams.

Division
The city of Mumbai lies on Salsette Island. Administratively it has two official divisions: Mumbai City district (Churchgate to Mahim) and Mumbai Suburban district (Bandra to Dahisar).Mumbai City district consists of the island city that lies to the south of Salsette Island. This region is called South Mumbai. The western part of Mumbai Suburban district (to the west of Sanjay Gandhi National Park) is called the Western Suburbs and the eastern part of the district is called the Eastern Suburbs.

The northernmost portion of the island, which is outside of the Mumbai city limits, lies in Thane District.

South Mumbai, the Western Suburbs and the Eastern Suburbs are not officially defined divisions of Mumbai and different people may include different areas in each division. This article uses the most popular divisions.

Transport

Air
Chhatrapati Shivaji International Airport is located in Andheri. Most 5-star hotels are located nearby. Juhu Aerodrome, which is used by small private aircraft and as a heliport, is located in Juhu.

Rail
Each of the suburbs has a railway station on the Western and the Harbour line of the city's suburban railway system. Bandra, Andheri, Borivali and Bhayander are important railway stations. A branch of the Harbour line terminates at Goregaon with further extension up to Borivali-Bhayander in the planning stage. Bandra Terminus is one of the six terminals for long-distance trains in Mumbai. Line 1 of the Mumbai Metro also spans the entire suburb of Andheri.

Road
The Western Express Highway (WEH) connects Bhayander-Mira Road-Dahisar-Borivali belt, the northernmost suburb of the Western Suburbs, to Vile Parle-Bandra belt and then Worli and South Mumbai via the Bandra–Worli Sea Link. WEH runs parallel to the Western Line, which is on its western side.

SV Road (Swami Vivekananda Road) is another major road in the Western Suburbs, it begins in Bandra in the south and ends at the Dahisar Flyover junction with the Western Express Highway in the north.

However, connectivity from the Eastern Suburbs is poor. The Andheri-Ghatkopar Link Road, Jogeshwari – Vikhroli Link Road (JVLR), the Andheri-Kurla Road and the Santa Cruz – Chembur Link Road (SCLR) are the major road links between the Eastern and Western Suburbs.

Bus services are provided by Brihanmumbai Electric Supply and Transport (BEST). The "200" & "300" series buses serves the Western Suburbs.

See also
Central Line (Mumbai Suburban Railway)
Mira-Bhayandar
Eastern Suburbs (Mumbai)
South Mumbai

Notes

References

External links

Geography of Mumbai